Yadgir Lok Sabha constituency was a former Lok Sabha constituency in Hyderabad State.  This seat came into existence in 1951. With the implementation of States Reorganisation Act, 1956, it ceased to exist.

Assembly segments
Yadgir Lok Sabha constituency comprised the following seven Legislative Assembly segments:
Raichur
Deodurg
Shorapur
Andole Jewargi
Tandur Serum
Yadgir
Shahpur

After Raichur district and Kalaburagi district of erstwhile Hyderabad State got merged with Mysore State in 1956, this seat ceased to exist and was replaced by Raichur Lok Sabha constituency.

Members of Parliament 
1952: Krishnacharya Joshi, Indian National Congress

Notes

See also
 Raichur Lok Sabha constituency
 Gulbarga Lok Sabha constituency
 Koppal Lok Sabha constituency
 Kalaburagi district
 Raichur district
 List of former constituencies of the Lok Sabha

Kalaburagi district
Raichur district
Yadgir district
Former constituencies of the Lok Sabha
1956 disestablishments in India
Constituencies disestablished in 1956
Politics of Hyderabad, India
Former Lok Sabha constituencies of Karnataka